The great Indian bustard (Ardeotis nigriceps) or Indian bustard, is a bustard found on the Indian subcontinent. A large bird with a horizontal body and long bare legs, giving it an ostrich like appearance, this bird is among the heaviest of the flying birds. Once common on the dry plains of the Indian subcontinent, as few as 150 individuals were estimated to survive in 2018 (reduced from an estimated 250 individuals in 2011) and the species is critically endangered by hunting and loss of its habitat, which consists of large expanses of dry grassland and scrub. These birds are often found associated in the same habitat as blackbuck. It is protected under Wildlife Protection Act 1972 of India.

Description

The great Indian bustard is a large ground bird with a height of about one metre. It is unmistakable with its black cap contrasting with the pale head and neck. The body is brownish with a black patch spotted in white. The male is deep sandy buff coloured and during the breeding season has a black breast band. The crown of the head is black and crested and is puffed up by displaying males. In the female which is smaller than the male, the head and neck are not pure white and the breast band is either rudimentary, broken or absent.

Among bustards, this species is smaller only than the Kori bustard and the great bustard in size. It is also the largest land bird in its native range. The female as in most members of the bustard family are typically considerably smaller.

Males have a well-developed gular pouch which is inflated when calling during display and helps produce the deep resonant calls.

Abnormally leucistic or near albino birds have been reported.

Distribution and habitat

This species was formerly widespread in India and Pakistan. The bustard is critically endangered in Pakistan primarily due to lack of protection and rampant hunting. A few birds were detected in a September 2013 survey of the Cholistan Desert in Pakistan.

In India, the bird was historically found in Punjab, Haryana, Uttar Pradesh, Madhya Pradesh, Chhattisgarh, Odisha, Andhra Pradesh, Rajasthan, Gujarat, Maharashtra, Karnataka and Tamil Nadu. Today the bustard is restricted to isolated pockets in Andhra Pradesh, Gujarat, Karnataka, Maharashtra, Madhya Pradesh and Rajasthan (shared with Pakistan).

Great Indian bustards make local movements but these are not well understood although it is known that populations disperse after the monsoons. Males are said to be solitary during the breeding season but form small flocks in winter. Males may however distribute themselves close together and like other bustards they are believed to use a mating system that has been termed as an "exploded or dispersed lek". The male is polygamous.

The habitat where it is most often found is arid and semi-arid grasslands, open country with thorn scrub, tall grass interspersed with cultivation. It avoids irrigated areas. The major areas where they are known to breed are in central and western India and eastern Pakistan. The dry semi-desert regions where it was found in parts of Rajasthan has been altered by irrigation canals that have transformed the region into an intensively farmed area.

Behaviour and ecology
The great Indian bustard is omnivorous. Apparently, insects, consisting mainly of Orthoptera, but also beetles,( particularly Mylabris sp.) are preferred in the diet. Alternatively, they will take grass seeds, berries (largely of the genera Ziziphus and Eruca), rodents and reptiles (in Rajasthan they are known to take Indian spiny-tailed lizards Uromastyx hardwickii). In cultivated areas, they feed on crops such as exposed groundnut, millets and pods of legumes.

They drink water if it is available and will sometimes sit down to drink or suck water followed by raising up their heads at an angle. When threatened, hens are said to carry young chicks under the wing. Young birds have been recorded to dust-bathe frequently.

Breeding occurs between March and September, when the inflated fluffy white feathers of the male are inflated and displayed. Territorial fights between males may involve strutting next to each other, leaping against each other with legs against each other and landing down to lock the opponent's head under their neck. During courtship display, the male inflates the gular sac which opens under the tongue, inflating it so that a large wobbly bag appears to hang down from the neck. The tail is held cocked up over the body. The male also raises the tail and folds it on its back. The male periodically produces a resonant deep, booming call that may be heard for nearly 500m. The female lays a single egg in an unlined scrape on the ground. Only the females are involved in incubation and care of the young. The eggs are at risk of destruction from other animals particularly ungulates and crows. Females may use a distraction display that involves flying zigzag with dangling legs.

Status

In 2011 Birdlife International uplisted this species from Endangered to Critically Endangered, mainly because it has been extirpated from 90% of its former range and the population was estimated at perhaps fewer than 250 individuals in 2008. The main threats are hunting and habitat loss. In the past they were heavily hunted for their meat and for sport and, today, poaching of the species may continue. In some places, such as Rajasthan, increased irrigation by the Indira Gandhi canal has led to increased agriculture and the altered habitat has led to the disappearance of the species from these regions. Some populations migrate into Pakistan where hunting pressure is high. The bird is found in Rajasthan, Karnataka, Maharashtra, Madhya Pradesh and Gujarat states of India. Desert National Park, near Jaisalmer and coastal grasslands of the Abdasa and Mandvi talukas of Kutch District of Gujarat support some populations. Ghatigaon and Karera sanctuaries in Madhya Pradesh once held sizeable populations. Other sanctuaries with the species include Kutch Bustard Sanctuary of Naliya in Kutch, Karera Wildlife Sanctuary in Shivpuri district;Great Indian Bustard Sanctuary near Nannaj, 18 km from Solapur in Maharashtra, Shrigonda taluka in Ahmednagar district of Maharashtra, near Nagpur and near Warora in Chandrapur district in Maharashtra and Rollapadu Wildlife Sanctuary, 45 km from Kurnool in Andhra Pradesh. At Ranibennur Blackbuck Sanctuary, habitat changes have affected the populations of blackbuck and bustards. In the 1950s the scrub forest was replaced with Eucalyptus plantations. These helped wildlife when the trees were short but after their extensive growth they made the adjoining grassland less favourable for bustards.

A 2011 study of the variability in mitochondrial DNA (hypervariable control region II and cytochrome b) in 63 samples from 5 Indian states found very low genetic diversity suggesting a historical population reduction. The study suggested a population reduction or near extinction estimated about 20–40,000 years ago.
Attempts to breed them in captivity in the 1970s failed. The species is considered as "critically endangered" by the IUCN Red data list.

Conservation
The rapid reduction of the population of India's bustards, their endangered status and the decline of grasslands led the Ministry of Environment and Forests to prepare species recovery programs in 2012 for three species of bustard; the great Indian bustard, the Bengal florican (Houbaropsis bengalensis) and the lesser florican (Sypheotides indicus). These programs remain to be finalised and executed by the state wildlife departments. The state of Rajasthan initiated "Project Great Indian Bustard", on World Environment Day 2013, identifying and fencing off bustard breeding grounds in existing protected areas as well as provide secure breeding enclosures in areas outside protected areas.

Current threats to the species include the development of linear infrastructure intrusions such as roads and electric power lines in the desert that lead to collision-related mortality. Proposed expansion of renewable energy infrastructure, which may involve deploying solar panels over large areas of desert and grasslands is another threat to the bird's habitat.

In 2020, nine chicks were incubated successfully creating a world record.

In culture

The Mughal emperor Babur noted that "[while] the flesh of the leg of some fowls, and of the breast of others is excellent; the flesh of every part of the Kharchal is delicious". The great Indian bustard was however a cryptic and wary bird making it a challenge for sportsmen, who had to stalk carefully (sometimes using covered bullock carts) to get within range. British soldiers in India considered it a delicacy and the species was among the top game-birds. William Henry Sykes notes that they were common in the Deccan region where a "gentleman" had shot a thousand birds. (E C Stuart Baker however notes that this may have been an exaggeration- ...we must remember that those were the days when tigers averaged twelve feet...) Jerdon noted that subadults and females had tastier flesh than males while Salim Ali notes that feeding on Mylabris (now Hycleus) tainted their flesh.

Tribal Bhils are claimed to have used a technique for trapping females that involves setting twigs on fire around the nest containing an egg or chick. The female was then said to run to the nest and singe its wings upon which the tribals captured it. Other trapping methods involving the use of nooses are described by Hume in his "Game Birds of India". The invention of the Jeep changed the method of hunting and it became extremely easy for hunters to chase bustards down in their open semi-desert habitats.

The name hoom is used in parts of Maharashtra and is derived from the low booming call. The sharp barking alarm call leads to its name of hookna in some parts of northern India. It is known in some other parts as Gaganbher or Gurayin for the resemblance of other calls to thunder or the roar of a tiger.

When the "national bird" of India was under consideration, the great Indian bustard was a proposed candidate (strongly supported by the Indian ornithologist Salim Ali), but dropped in favour of the Indian peafowl with at least one reason being the potential for being misspelt.

References

Other sources
 Bhushan, B. (1985) The food and feeding behaviour of the Great Indian Bustard Choriotis nigriceps (Vigors). Class Aves: Otididae. M.Sc. dissertation. University of Bombay, Bombay.
 Dharmakumarsinhji RS (1957) Ecological study of the Great Indian Bustard Ardeotis nigriceps( Vigors)[ Aves : Otididae] in Kathiawar Peninsula, western India. J. Zool. Soc. India 9:139-52.
 Dharmakumarsinhji, RS (1962) Display, posturing and behaviour of the Great Indian Bustard Choriotis nigriceps (Vigors). Proc. 2nd All-India Congress. Zoology. Part 2:277-283

External links

Videos and photographs
Arkive - images and movies
BirdLife Species Factsheet

great Indian bustard
Birds of India
Birds of Pakistan
Critically endangered fauna of Asia
great Indian bustard
Symbols of Rajasthan
Fauna of the Thar Desert